Klipdrif Dam is an earth-fill type dam located on the Loopspruit and Enselspruit near Potchefstroom, North West, South Africa. The river flowing out the dam is the Loopspruit. It was established in 1990 and its primary purpose is to serve for irrigation. The hazard potential of the dam has been ranked significant (2).

Fauna 
The reservoir contains a healthy population of Common Carp (Cyprinus carpio) as well as  Sharptooth Catfish (Clarias gariepinus), Orange River Mudfish (Labeo capensis), Moggel (Labeo umbratus), Smallmouth Yellowfish (Labeobarbus aeneus), Largemouth Bass (Micropterus dolomieu), Banded Tilapia (Tilapia sparrmanii), Threespot Barb ( Enteromius trimaculatus), Chubbyhead Barb (Enteromius anoplus), Straightfin Barb (Enteromius paulindnosus), Southern Mouthbrooder (Pseudocrenilabrus philander), Rock Catfish (Austroglanis sclateri) and Western Mosquitofish (Gumbisa affinis).

There is a healthy bird population around the dam with birds such as African Fish Eagle, Greater and Lesser Flamingo, Egyptian Goose, Red-knobbed coot, Moorhen, White-faced Whistling Duck, African Black Duck, Cape and Red-billed Teal, Southern Pochard, Yellow-billed Duck, Yellow-billed Stork, Abdim's Stork, White Stork, Grey Heron, Goliath Heron, Purple Heron, Black-headed Heron, Black-crowned Night Heron, African Spoonbill, Pied Kingfisher, Malachite Kingfisher, Giant Kingfisher, Helmet Guineafowl, Osprey, Grey-headed Gull and various Terns, Coursers, Plovers and Wagtails residing in and around the reservoir.

Other animals residing in and around the dam include Cape Clawless Otter, Blesbok, Grey Rhebok, Common Duiker, Steenbok, Warthog, Black-backed Jackal, Cape Fox, Aardwolf,  African Wild Cat, Caracal, Porcupine, Aardvark, Southern Hedgehog, Cape Pangolin, Honey Badger, Cape and Scrub Hare, Springhare as well as feral cat's and dog's. Reptiles include Nile and Rock Monitor Lizards, African Rock Python, Puffadder, Rinkhals and Leopard Tortoise. African Bullfrog can also be found around the dam.

Flora 
The vegetation around the dam is typical Highveld Grassland used for cattle grazing. There are scattered reed beds (Phragmites spp.) along the reservoir, with thick reed beds  (Phragmites spp.) along the banks near the inlet. The reservoir contains thick beds of algae sludge and also blue floating algae.

Uses

Angling 
The dam is popular amongst recreational anglers, with competitions being hosted along the banks each year.

Irrigation 
The dams main purpose was to provide water for irrigation for farm lands downstream from the dam.

Water Sports 
Boating, water skiing and canoeing are all popular at the dam.

See also
List of reservoirs and dams in South Africa
List of rivers of South Africa

References 

 List of South African Dams from the Department of Water Affairs

Dams in South Africa
Dams completed in 1918